Howard Payne University is a private Baptist university in Brownwood, Texas. It is affiliated with the Baptist General Convention of Texas. Howard Payne College was founded by Noah T. Byers and John David Robnett in 1889. The institution is named for its first major benefactor, Edward Howard Payne, who was the brother-in-law of Robnett.

Athletic programs include NCAA Division III football, baseball, softball, women's volleyball, men and women's soccer, basketball and tennis. The HPU mascot is a yellow jacket named "Buzzsaw".

The university also has extension centers located in New Braunfels, Texas and in El Paso, Texas.

Founding and history

On June 20, 1889, Howard Payne College was founded at Indian Creek by members of the Pecan Valley Baptist Association, Noah T. Byers and John David Robnett. It was named for its first financial benefactor and Robnett's brother-in-law, Edward Howard Payne. The first classes at HPC were held in 1890, with the first degree being granted in 1895 to Robnett. In 1915, the yellow jacket was chosen by Carrie (Camp) Allen as the university mascot.

Thomas H. Taylor led the university through the Great Depression, which began just two months into his presidency. Robert Mangrum, university historian of HPU, states that it was made apparent to Taylor at the 1930 Texas Baptist convention that HPU would have to be closed due to an inability to continue funding through the BGCT. A faculty prayer meeting was held upon his return to Brownwood, writes Mangrum, and it was decided that HPC would continue to operate with no deficits through the receipts and endowment interests.

Daniel Baker College, a Presbyterian college located in Brownwood, consolidated with HPC in 1953, while Taylor was president. Taylor retired as the university's longest-serving president (26 years) after leading the college through the hardship of the Great Depression and helping the campus expand.

Guy D. Newman was named president of HPC following Taylor's retirement. Under Newman's leadership, the Douglas MacArthur Academy of Freedom was established. The program is now called the Guy D. Newman Honors Academy and is still housed in the Academy of Freedom, formerly DBC's main building. Newman retired in 1972. HPC became Howard Payne University in 1974 under the presidency of Roger Brooks.

Don Newbury, a 1961 graduate of HPU, served as president of the university from 1985 to 1997. HPU's student enrollment increased significantly during Newbury's presidency. The university also underwent numerous upgrades and additions to campus facilities. HPU's "Buzzsaw" mascot was also announced in 1996, during Newbury's presidency.

The university celebrated on of its most significant athletics successes during the 2000s with the HPU women's basketball team capping a perfect 33-0 season by winning the 2008 NCAA Division III Women's Basketball National Championship.

Cory Hines, a 1997 graduate of HPU, was named president in 2019. Under his presidency, ground was broken for the Newbury Family Welcome Center in 2020. Construction on the project is scheduled for completion in spring 2022. The university also began restoring the Douglas MacArthur Academy of Freedom's wings in 2020. Other campus improvement projects were completed in 2020 and 2021, including renovations to the Veda Hodge Residence Hall lobby, the Newbury Place Student Apartments and the lobbies of the Guy D. Newman Hall of American Ideals.

Presidents

 A. J. Emerson 1890 -1893
 John D. Robnett 1893- 1896
 James H. Grove 1896- 1908
 John S. Humphreys  (Acting President) 1908–1910
 Robert H. Hamilton 1910–1911
 John S. Humphreys 1911–1913
 James M. Carroll 1913–1914
 Anderson E. Baten (Vice President & Acting President) 1915–1917
 Judson A. Tolman 1917–1919
 L. J. Mims 1919–1922
 William R. Hornburg (Vice President & Acting President) 1922–1923
 Edgar Godbold 1923–1929 
 Thomas H. Taylor 1929–1955
 Guy D. Newman 1955–1973
 Roger Brooks 1973–1979
 Charles A. Stewart (Chief Executive officer) 1979–1980
 Ralph A. Phelps Jr. 1980–1985
 Don Newbury 1985–1997
 Rick Gregory 1997–2002
 Russell H. Dilday (Interim President) 2002- 2003
 Lanny Hall 2003–2009
 William Ellis 2009–2018
 Paul Armes (Interim President) 2018-2019
 Cory Hines 2019–present

Athletics

The school supports an active athletic program for both men's and women's competition in the NCAA Division III.  The school is currently a member of the American Southwest Conference.

National championship teams
Howard Payne University teams achieved national championship status in 1957 and 1964 in NAIA Cross country, and in 2008 with NCAA Division III Women's Basketball.

Football
Football began at Howard Payne in 1903. Gwinn Henry was named the first head coach in 1912 and coached for two seasons.

Campus life

In 2015 the university was granted an exception to Title IX allowing it to discriminate against LGBT students for religious reasons. In 2016 the organization Campus Pride ranked the college among the worst schools in Texas for LGBT students.

Greek organizations
 Alpha Delta Kappa
 Alpha Psi Omega
  Chi Alpha Omega sorority 
 Delta Chi Rho
 Delta Omicron (Co-ed International Music Fraternity) Inactive
 Iota Chi Alpha
 Kappa Kappa Psi (National Honorary Band Fraternity)
 Delta Epsilon Omega 
 Tau Beta Sigma (National Honorary Band Sorority)
 Zeta Chi

Notable alumni

 Coffey Anderson, singer
 O. L. Bodenhamer, 12th national commander of The American Legion from 1929 to 1930
 Cynthia Clawson, Grammy Award-winning musician
 Keith Crawford, NFL player
 Ronnie Floyd, president and chief executive officer of the Southern Baptist Convention
 Ken Gray, NFL Pro Bowl player
 Slim Harriss, Major League Baseball player
 Ray Hildebrand, one half of the duo Paul & Paula
 Robert E. Howard, writer and creator of Conan the Barbarian
 Jill Jackson, one half of the duo Paul & Paula
 Ray Jacobs, four-time NFL All-Star
 Ken Sanders, NFL player
 J. D. Sheffield, Texas State representative from Coryell County
 Bob Young, NFL All-Pro player

References

External links

Howard Payne Athletics website

 
1889 establishments in Texas
Buildings and structures in Brown County, Texas
Council for Christian Colleges and Universities
Education in Brown County, Texas
Educational institutions established in 1889
New Braunfels, Texas
Private universities and colleges in Texas
Universities and colleges accredited by the Southern Association of Colleges and Schools
Universities and colleges affiliated with the Baptist General Convention of Texas
Universities and colleges affiliated with the Southern Baptist Convention